Radical honesty (RH) is the practice of complete honesty without telling even white lies. The phrase was trademarked in 1997 as a technique and self-improvement program based on the 1996 bestselling book Radical Honesty by Brad Blanton. While proponents of Radical Honesty present the practice as a moral imperative, Blanton's programs argue against moralism and promote Radical Honesty as a means of reducing stress, deepening connections with others, and reducing reactivity.

Brad Blanton
At a Moth Mainstage event in 2009, radio producer and writer Starlee Kine related her experience with Radical Honesty, which she labelled a cult. Kine described a seminar where Blanton was verbally abusive and at one point urged her to sign a contract to obey him completely for the duration of the seminar.

In popular culture
The character Eli Loker, played by Brendan Hines, from the 2009 Fox series Lie to Me, adheres to Radical Honesty during the first season. From the website bio of the character in the first season: "Eli Loker is Lightman's lead researcher, who is so uncomfortable with the human tendency to lie that he's decided to practice what he calls "radical honesty". He says everything on his mind at all times and often pays the price".

In the Divergent series, the Candor faction is dedicated to practicing Radical Honesty.

Writer A.J. Jacobs devotes a chapter in his book The Guinea Pig Diaries to his attempts to live according to the precepts of Radical Honesty. Author Brandon Mendelson is a practitioner of a modified form of Radical Honesty.

In the last book of the Uglies series by Scott Westerfeld, a character named Frizz Mizuno invents a surgical brain procedure called "Radical Honesty" that renders him unable to lie. In fact, if he hears someone tell a lie when he himself knows the truth, he can't even simply not speak—he has to reveal the truth under any circumstances. Even at the possible cost of his own life and the lives of people he cares about, he still can't lie to save them, because his brain is wired to speak the truth.

In episode 20, season 6 of Bones, The Pinocchio in the Planter, the victim, Ross Dickson, is part of a fictional group called "The Honesty Policy" that practices Radical Honesty. The episode explores radical honesty from the perspective of the victim being deliberately rude and belligerent, with ill effects potentially leading to his demise, and with a crass and alienating character who attends the same group. However, it also explores, through several character subplots, positive outcomes resulting from honesty inspired by encountering the concept of Radical Honesty. The phrase "Radical Honesty" is used throughout the episode.

In episode 3, season 5 of Silicon Valley, Chief Operating Officer, a character called Ben Burkhardt, played by Benjamin Koldyke, follows a leadership philosophy developed by Kim Scott called "Radical Candor", or as he calls it, "RadCan", which bears many of the hallmarks of a warped version of Radical Honesty. As an example, for comedic purposes, he is 'honest about lying' and withholding information from other characters when speaking with third parties.

Bibliography
 Blanton, Brad 1996, Radical Honesty: How to Transform Your Life by Telling the Truth, Dell; 7th Printing edition, 
 Blanton, Brad 2000, Practicing Radical Honesty, SparrowHawk Publications, 
 Blanton, Brad 2001, Honest to God: A Change of Heart That Can Change the World, SparrowHawk Publications, 
 Blanton, Brad 2002, Radical Parenting: Seven Steps to a Functional Family in a Dysfunctional World, SparrowHawk Publications, 
 Blanton, Brad 2004, The Truthtellers, SparrowHawk Publications,  
 Blanton, Brad 2005, Radical Honesty, the New Revised Edition: How to Transform Your Life by Telling the Truth, SparrowHawk Publications; Revised edition, 
 Blanton, Brad 2006, Beyond Good and Evil: The Eternal Split-Second Sound–Light Being, SparrowHawk Publications, 
 Blanton, Brad 2011, The Korporate Kannibal Kookbook – The Empire Is Consuming Us, SparrowHawk Publications,

References

External links
 Center for Radical Honesty
 I Think You're Fat, an article in Esquire magazine on the subject of Radical Honesty, containing an interview with Blanton and a description of the writer's experiment in Radical Honesty.
 Brad Blanton's Radical Honesty
 Radical honesty at Less Wrong
  The Moth Presents Starlee Kine: Radical Honesty American Journalist Starlee Kine gives a humorous (and honest) account of her attendance at a Radical Honesty workshop. From a 2009 Moth Mainstage event.

Personal development
Lying
Truth